The 1893–94 Football Tournament was the 5th staging of The Football Tournament.

In case of a tie, extra-time was played, but unlike the previous seasons in the league, matches that ended in a draw after extra time were not replayed. The match between Akademisk Boldklub and Kjøbenhavns Boldklub in the spring of 1894, which ended in a 3-3 draw after extended playing time, thus became the first draw in the history of the Football Tournament that was not replayed.

Overview
It was contested by 5 teams, and Akademisk Boldklub won the championship for the third time in a row. And at the time, winning a championship for three years in a row meant gaining the legitimate property of the cup, thus Boldklub gained the right to keep the trophy.

League standings

References

External links
RSSSF

1893–94 in Danish football
Top level Danish football league seasons
The Football Tournament seasons
Denmark